Elstree Screen Arts Academy (formerly Elstree University Technical College) is a university technical college (UTC) located in Borehamwood, Hertfordshire, England, which opened in September 2013. The UTC specialises in behind-the-scenes media production, digital communications and entertainment technologies with a curriculum that is designed to ensure strong foundations in fundamental academic subjects and build on these with vocational, expressive and industry relevant studies.

The UTC's lead sponsor is the University of Hertfordshire; other sponsors include Elstree Studios. The UTC occupies newly developed buildings on Elstree Way. The conversion was designed by Ellis Williams Architects and was undertaken by Willmott Dixon Interiors.

Educational vision
Elstree Screen Arts Academy offers full-time technically orientated courses to 600 students aged 14–19. A range of courses have a focus on technical skills, trades, crafts and technologies that support the entertainment, film, television, theatre, visual arts and digital communication industries.

Partners
Elstree Screen Arts Academy is supported by employers such as Elstree Studios, BBC, Apples & Snakes, MOBO Awards and Apps for Good and is supported by Skillset, Hertfordshire County Council, Hertsmere Borough Council, Hertfordshire Chamber of Commerce & Industry, The Watford UTC, The Grange Academy, The Harefield Academy and Hertswood Academy.

Performance
Ofsted inspected the UTC in May 2017 and gave an overall grading of 'Requires improvement', although the UTC was assessed as 'Good' for 'Effectiveness of leadership and management' and 'Personal development, behaviour and welfare'. At that time, 332 students were enrolled.

References

External links
 
 University Technical Colleges

Schools in Hertsmere
University Technical Colleges
Secondary schools in Hertfordshire
Educational institutions established in 2013
2013 establishments in England
University of Hertfordshire
Borehamwood